Gambia Bird Airlines Limited was the flag carrier airline of Gambia headquartered in Kanifing with its home base at Banjul International Airport.

History
Gambia Bird was founded by the German carrier Germania in October 2012. The airline was launched in partnership with the Government of Gambia in order to replace the services of Air Afrique, which was liquidated in 2002. Germania retained a 90% ownership share of Gambia Bird.

Flights to Barcelona were introduced on 28 October.

In , Gambia Bird suspended operations until further notice. By May 2015, there had not been any resumption of services. The former aircraft of Gambia Bird were taken back into service with its parent, Germania. In March 2015, Germania's CEO stated that a resumption of services by Gambia Bird was unlikely, due to an insufficient perspective for future development.

Destinations
Gambia Bird served the following destinations, :

Fleet

As of December 2014, the Gambia Bird fleet consisted of the following aircraft:

See also		
 List of defunct airlines of the Gambia
 Transport in the Gambia

References

External links

 

Defunct airlines of the Gambia
Airlines established in 2012
Airlines disestablished in 2014
2012 establishments in the Gambia
2014 disestablishments in Africa
Greater Banjul Area